Mutiny in the Arctic is a 1941 American action adventure film directed by John Rawlins and starring Richard Arlen, Andy Devine and Anne Nagel. It was part of their Aces of Action series produced and released by Universal Pictures. It was also known by the alternative title Northern Lights.

Cast
 Richard Arlen as Dick Barclay
 Andy Devine as Andy Adams
 Anne Nagel as 	Gloria Adams
 Addison Richards as Ferguson
 Don Terry as Cole
 Oscar O'Shea as 	Capt. Bob Morrissey
 Harry Cording as 	Harmon
 Jeff Corey as 	The Cook
 Harry Strang as 	The Helmsman
 John Rogers as 	The Mess Boy
 John Bagni as Loma
 Stanley Blystone as The Bos'un
 David Sharpe as 	Joe - Crewman
 Samuel Adams as 	First Officer Swenson 
 Gibson Gowland as Crewman

Production
Filming took place in March 1941. Its budget was $80,000.

Reception
The New York Times said "as juveniles go, this rates as a flat B."

References

External links
Mutiny in the Arctic at IMDb
Mutiny in the Arctic at TCMDB
Mutiny in the Arctic at BFI

1941 films
American action films
American adventure films
1941 adventure films
1940s English-language films
Films directed by John Rawlins
1940s action films
American black-and-white films
1940s American films
Universal Pictures films